Jan Hruška (born 4 February 1975) is a former professional road bicycle racer from the Czech Republic, who turned professional in 1996.

Doping
Hruška entered the 2000 Summer Olympics, but was removed after testing for a doping product.

Major results

1996
 10th Overall Peace Race
1997
 10th Overall Hofbräu Cup
1998
 3rd Time trial, National Road Championships
 6th Overall Herald Sun Tour
1999
 1st  Time trial, National Road Championships
 2nd Overall Vuelta a Rioja
 2nd Overall Tour de Beauce
 3rd Overall Herald Sun Tour
1st Stage 5
 4th Overall Peace Race
2000
 Giro d'Italia
1st Prologue & Stage 20 (ITT)
Held  after Prologue
 2nd Overall Tirreno–Adriatico
2002
 1st Stage 5 Volta ao Algarve
 2nd Overall Vuelta a Murcia
 3rd Circuito de Getxo
 8th Overall Tirreno–Adriatico
 9th Overall Circuit Cycliste de la Sarthe
2003
 1st Stage 3 (ITT) Vuelta a Rioja 
 Vuelta a España 
1st Stage 1 (TTT) 
Held  after Stage 1 
 1st Stage 1 (TTT) Volta a Catalunya 
 2nd Overall Vuelta a Murcia
2004
 3rd Overall Deutschland Tour
 6th Overall Vuelta a Aragón
 9th Overall Vuelta a Castilla y León
2005
 7th Overall Tour de Pologne
2006
 1st  Overall Clásica Internacional de Alcobendas
1st  Points classification
1st Stage 3 (ITT)
 4th Overall Vuelta a Murcia
 5th Overall Volta ao Distrito de Santarém
2007
 7th Overall Vuelta a Castilla y León
 9th Overall Volta ao Alentejo
2008
 2nd Time trial, National Road Championships

See also
 List of doping cases in cycling
List of sportspeople sanctioned for doping offences

References

External links
 
 Personal website 

1975 births
Living people
People from Uničov
Czech male cyclists
Czech Giro d'Italia stage winners
Doping cases in cycling
Sportspeople from the Olomouc Region